Ramin Mammadov Alamshah oglu  (born 17 February 1979) is a 
Member of Parliament of Azerbaijan.

Early life 
Ramin Alamshah oglu Mammadov was born on February 17, 1979, in Aghdara, Azerbaijan Soviet Socialist Republic. He studied at Baku State University. His study direction was International Relations and Affairs. In 2000, he graduated with a bachelor's degree, in 2002, a master's degree. In 2013, he obtained Executive Education, Organizational Leadership in Harvard University, John F. Kennedy School of Government in the United States. Ramin Mammadov is married.

Career 

Ramin Mammadov devoted much of his career for the  State Committee on Affairs with Diaspora. He started as Deputy Chief of Staff in 2012 and became Deputy Chairman in 2016. Also he was a Chairman of the World Union of Azerbaijani Youth between 2012 and 2016. He is a  Member of Political Council of the New Azerbaijan Party since 2013.
In 2014 he started to work at the International Conference of Asian Political Parties (ICAPP) as a Senior Vice-president of Youth Wing, in 2019 he continued as a Co-Chairman there. After March, 2020 Ramin Mammadov is a Member of Parliament of the Azerbaijan Republic.

Awards 

 Medal "For Distinction in the Civil Service" by the Order of the President of the Republic of Azerbaijan Mr. Ilham Aliyev dated July 6, 2012.
 Medal "Progress" by the Order of the President of the Republic of Azerbaijan Mr. Ilham Aliyev dated November 18, 2017.

References 

1979 births
Living people
Azerbaijani politicians
21st-century Azerbaijani politicians
New Azerbaijan Party politicians